"Gone" is a song by American singer Bebe Rexha. It was released on December 19, 2014.

The song tells of the singer lamenting a past love. The chorus contains the lyrics "Cause I'm a lost river that'll never reach the sea  / When you're not here with me, when you're gone / I'm sick to my bones, I don't feel natural / Without you I'm not whole, when you're gone."

In Australia, the song was used in television advertisements promoting the drama series Love Child on the Nine Network.

Background
Following appearances on albums by Pitbull (Globalization) and David Guetta (Listen), Rexha worked on a follow up to her debut solo single "I Can't Stop Drinking About You", released earlier in 2014.

On December 19, Rexha released two singles, "I'm Gonna Show You Crazy" and "Gone". "Gone" is described as "a tender, piano and string-filled ballad and was produced and co-written by Frequency and Aalias, the same team behind Eminem's 'The Monster'."

Review
Luis Gonzalez of Album Confessions said; "'Gone' succeeds thanks to the stripped back production, Rexha's impressive delivery and a touching, heartbreaking message of lost love. The perfect blend of soft strings and piano turn out to be the right fit for a sure-to-be-critically-acclaimed performance. It is a delicate ballad tailored for Top 40 radio and one that screams for attention for all the right reasons."

Charts

Release history

References

2014 songs
2014 singles
Bebe Rexha songs
Warner Records singles
Songs written by Bebe Rexha